Fee Teng Liew (born 10 June 1999) is an English badminton player and a national champion.

Biography
Liew became an English National doubles champion after winning the English National Badminton Championships mixed doubles title with Max Flynn in 2020.

Achievements

BWF International 
Women's doubles

Mixed doubles

 BWF International Challenge tournament
 BWF International Series tournament
 BWF Future Series tournament

References 

1999 births
Living people
English female badminton players